The Catholic Church in Scotland overseen by the Scottish Bishops' Conference, is part of the worldwide Catholic Church headed by the Pope. After being firmly established in Scotland for nearly a millennium, the Catholic Church was outlawed following the Scottish Reformation in 1560. Catholic Emancipation in 1793 and 1829 helped Catholics regain both religious and civil rights. In 1878, the Catholic hierarchy was formally restored. Throughout these changes, several pockets in Scotland retained a significant pre-Reformation Catholic population, including Banffshire, the Hebrides, and more northern parts of the Highlands, Galloway at Terregles House, Munches House, Kirkconnell House, New Abbey and Parton House and at Traquair in Peebleshire.

In 1716, Scalan seminary was established in the Highlands and rebuilt in the 1760s by Bishop John Geddes, a well-known figure in Edinburgh during the Scottish Enlightenment. When Scottish national poet Robert Burns, who also gifted the Bishop with the volume now known as The Geddes Burns, wrote to a correspondent that "the first [that is, finest] cleric character I ever saw was a Roman Catholick", he was referring to Bishop John Geddes. The Gàidhealtachd has been both Catholic and Protestant in modern times. A number of Scottish Gaelic-speaking areas, including Barra, Benbecula, South Uist, Eriskay, and Moidart, are mainly Catholic. Poet and novelist Angus Peter Campbell writes frequently about the Catholic Church in his work. (See also the "Religion of the Yellow Stick".)

In the 2011 census, 16% of the population of Scotland described themselves as being Catholic, compared with 32% affiliated with the Church of Scotland. Many Roman Catholics are Scottish Highland minorities or the descendants of Irish immigrants and of Highland migrants who moved to Scotland's cities and towns during the 19th century, especially during the famine in Ireland. However, there are also significant numbers of people of Italian, Lithuanian, and Polish descent, with more recent Polish immigrants again boosting the numbers of continental Catholic Europeans in Scotland. Owing to immigration (overwhelmingly white European), it is estimated that, in 2009, there were about 850,000 Catholics in a country of 5.1 million. Between 1994 and 2002, Catholic attendance in Scotland declined 19% to just over 200,000. By 2008, the Catholic Bishops' Conference of Scotland estimated that 184,283 attended Mass regularly.

History

Establishment

Christianity was probably introduced to what is now lowland Scotland from Roman soldiers stationed in the north of the province of Britannia. It is presumed to have survived among the Brythonic enclaves in the south of modern Scotland, but retreated as the pagan Anglo-Saxons advanced. Scotland was largely converted by Irish-Scots missions associated with figures such as St Columba from the fifth to the seventh centuries. These missions tended to found monastic institutions and collegiate churches that served large areas. Partly as a result of these factors, some scholars have identified a distinctive form of Celtic Christianity, in which abbots were more significant than bishops, attitudes to clerical celibacy were more relaxed, and there were some significant differences in practice with Roman Rite, particularly the form of tonsure and the method of calculating Easter, although most of these issues had been resolved by the mid-seventh century.  After the reconversion of Scandinavian Scotland from the tenth century, Christianity under papal authority was the dominant religion of the kingdom.

Medieval Catholicism

In the Norman period the Scottish church underwent a series of reforms and transformations. With royal and lay patronage, a clearer parochial structure based around local churches was developed. Large numbers of new foundations, which followed continental forms of reformed monasticism, began to predominate and the Scottish church established its independence from England and developed a clearer diocesan structure, becoming a "special daughter of the see of Rome" but lacking leadership in the form of archbishops. In the Late Middle Ages the problems of schism in the Catholic Church allowed the Scottish Crown to gain greater influence over senior appointments and two archbishoprics had been established by the end of the fifteenth century. While some historians have discerned a decline of monasticism in the Late Middle Ages, the mendicant orders of friars grew, particularly in the expanding burghs, to meet the spiritual needs of the population. New saints and cults of devotion also proliferated. Despite problems over the number and quality of clergy after the Black Death in the fourteenth century, and some evidence of heresy in this period, the church in Scotland remained relatively stable before the Reformation in the sixteenth century.

Scottish Reformation

That remained the case until the Scottish Reformation in the mid-16th century, when the Church in Scotland broke with the papacy and adopted a Calvinist confession in 1560. At that point, the celebration of the Catholic mass was outlawed. Although officially illegal, the Catholic Church survived in parts of Scotland. The hierarchy of the church played a relatively small role and the initiative was left to lay leaders. Where nobles or local lairds offered protection it continued to thrive, as with Clanranald on South Uist, or in the north-east where the Earl of Huntly was the most important figure. In these areas Catholic sacraments and practices were maintained with relative openness. Members of the nobility were probably reluctant to pursue each other over matters of religion because of strong personal and social ties. An English report in 1600 suggested that a third of nobles and gentry were still Catholic in inclination. In most of Scotland, Catholicism became an underground faith in private households, connected by ties of kinship. This reliance on the household meant that women often became important as the upholders and transmitters of the faith, such as in the case of Lady Fernihurst in the Borders. They transformed their households into centres of religious activity and offered places of safety for priests.

Because the reformed kirk took over the existing structures and assets of the Church, any attempted recovery by the Catholic hierarchy was extremely difficult. After the collapse of Mary's cause in the civil wars in the 1570s, and any hope of a national restoration of the old faith, the hierarchy began to treat Scotland as a mission area. The leading order of the Counter-reformation, the newly founded Jesuits, initially took relatively little interest in Scotland as a target of missionary work. Their effectiveness was limited by rivalries between different orders at Rome. The initiative was taken by a small group of Scots connected with the Crichton family, who had supplied the bishops of Dunkeld. They joined the Jesuit order and returned to attempt conversions. Their focus was mainly on the court, which led them into involvement in a series of complex political plots and entanglements. The majority of surviving Scottish lay followers were largely ignored. Some were to convert to the Catholic Church, as did John Ogilvie (1569–1615), who went on to be ordained a priest in 1610, later being hanged for proselytism in Glasgow and often thought of as the only Scottish Catholic martyr of the Reformation era. Nevertheless, the Catholic Church's illegal status had a devastating impact on The Church's fortunes, although a significant congregation did continue to adhere, especially in the more remote Gaelic-speaking areas of the Highlands and Islands.

Decline from the 17th century

Numbers probably reduced in the seventeenth century and organisation deteriorated.

The Pope appointed Thomas Nicolson as the first Vicar Apostolic over the mission in 1694. The country was organised into districts and by 1703 there were thirty-three Catholic clergy. In 1733 it was divided into two vicariates, one for the Highland and one for the Lowland, each under a bishop. A Catholic seminary in Scalan in Glenlivet was the preliminary centre of education for Catholic priests in the area. It was illegal, and it was burned to the ground on several occasions by redcoat soldiers sent from beyond The Highlands. Beyond Scalan there were six attempts to found a seminary in the Highlands between 1732 and 1838, all suffering financially under Catholicism's illegal status. Clergy entered the country secretly and although services were illegal they were maintained.

The aftermath of the failed Jacobite risings in 1715 and 1745 further increased the persecution faced by Roman Catholics in Scotland.

According to Bishop John Geddes, "Early in the spring of 1746, some ships of war came to the coast of the isle of Barra and landed some men, who threatened they would lay desolate the whole island if the priest was not delivered up to them. Father James Grant, who was missionary then, and afterward Bishop, being informed of the threats in a safe retreat in which he was in a little island, surrendered himself, and was carried prisoner to Mingarry Castle on the Western coast (i.e. Ardnamurchan) where he was detained for some weeks."

After long and cruel imprisonment with other Roman Catholic priests at Inverness and in a prison hulk anchored in the River Thames, Grant was deported to the Netherlands and warned never to return to the British Isles. Like the other priests deported with him, Fr. Grant returned to Scotland almost immediately. His fellow prisoner, Father Alexander Cameron, the younger brother to the Chief of Clan Cameron, was less fortunate and died in the prison hulk due to the hardship of his imprisonment. During the 21st century, the Knights of St. Columba at the University of Glasgow launched a campaign to canonize Fr. Cameron, "with the hope that he will become a great saint for Scotland and that our nation will merit from his intercession." They erected a small petition book at their altar of St. Joseph in the University Catholic Chapel, Turnbull Hall. It is one of the necessary prerequisites for Canonisation in the Roman Catholic Church that there is a Cult of Devotion to the saint.

Exact numbers of communicants are uncertain, given the illegal status of Catholicism. In 1755 it was estimated that there were some 16,500 communicants, mainly in the north and west. In 1764, "the total Catholic population in Scotland would have been about 33,000 or 2.6% of the total population. Of these 23,000 were in the Highlands". Another estimate for 1764 is of 13,166 Catholics in the Highlands, perhaps a quarter of whom had emigrated by 1790, and another source estimates Catholics as perhaps 10% of the population.

Impact of the Clearances

While most of the landlords responsible for the Highland Clearances did not target people for ethnic or religious reasons, there is evidence of anti-Catholicism among some of them. In particular, large numbers of Catholics emigrated from the Western Highlands in the period 1770 to 1810 and there is evidence that anti Catholic sentiment (along with famine, poverty and rising rents) was a contributory factor in that period. Noteworthy figures in the late stages of the specifically Catholic clearances and emigration from Scotland include Bishop Alexander Macdonnell, who, against the odds, made possible a Canadian Gaelic-speaking pioneer settlement in Glengarry County, Ontario, Upper CanadaCanada for the Glengarry Fencibles, a specifically Catholic regiment in the British Army, and their families, after its disbandment.

Large-scale Catholic immigration
During the 19th century, Irish immigration substantially increased the number of Catholics in the country, especially in Glasgow and its vicinity, and the West of Scotland. Initially, clergymen from the recusant tradition of North-East Scotland played an important part in providing support. Later Italian, Polish, and Lithuanian immigrants reinforced the numbers.

The Catholic hierarchy was re-established in 1878 by Pope Leo XIII at the beginning of his pontificate. Six new dioceses were created: five of them 
were organised into a single province with the Archbishop of St Andrews and Edinburgh as metropolitan; the Diocese of Glasgow remained separate and directly subject to the Apostolic See.

Sectarian tensions
Mass immigration to Scotland saw the emergence of sectarian tensions. In 1923, the Church of Scotland produced a (since repudiated) report, entitled The Menace of the Irish Race to our Scottish Nationality, accusing the largely immigrant Catholic population of subverting Presbyterian values and of spreading drunkenness, crime, and financial imprudence. Rev. John White, one of the senior leadership of the Church of Scotland at the time, called for a "racially pure" Scotland, declaring "Today there is a movement throughout the world towards the rejection of non-native constituents and the crystallization of national life from native elements."
 
Such officially hostile attitudes started to wane considerably from the 1930s and 1940s onwards, especially as the leadership of the Church of Scotland learned of what was happening in eugenics-conscious Nazi Germany and of the dangers of creating a "racially pure" national church; particularly as German people who were of even partially Slavic or Jewish ancestry were not considered "true" members of the Volk.

Social change and communal divisions
In 1986, the General Assembly of the Church of Scotland expressly repudiated the sections of the Westminster Confession directly attacking the Catholic Church. In 1990, both the Church of Scotland and the Catholic Church were founding members of the ecumenical bodies Churches Together in Britain and Ireland and Action of Churches Together in Scotland; relations between denominational leaders are now very cordial. Unlike the relationship between the hierarchies of the different churches, however, some communal tensions remain.

The association between football and displays of sectarian behaviour by some fans has been a source of embarrassment and concern to the management of certain clubs. The bitter rivalry between Celtic and Rangers in Glasgow, known as the Old Firm, is known worldwide for its sectarian dimension. Celtic was founded by Irish Catholic immigrants and Rangers has traditionally been supported by Unionists and Protestants. Sectarian tensions can still be very real, though perhaps diminished compared with past decades. Perhaps the greatest psychological breakthrough was when Rangers signed Mo Johnston (a Catholic) in 1989. Celtic, on the other hand, have never had a policy of not signing players due to their religion, and some of the club's greatest figures have been Protestants.

From the 1980s the UK government passed several acts that had provisions concerning sectarian violence. These included the Public Order Act 1986, which introduced offences relating to the incitement of racial hatred, and the Crime and Disorder Act 1998, which introduced offences of pursuing a racially aggravated course of conduct that amounts to harassment of a person. The 1998 Act also required courts to take into account where offences are racially motivated, when determining sentence. In the twenty-first century the Scottish Parliament legislated against sectarianism. This included provision for religiously aggravated offences in the Criminal Justice (Scotland) Act 2003. The Criminal Justice and Licensing (Scotland) Act 2010 strengthened statutory aggravations for both racially and religiously motivated hate crimes. The Offensive Behaviour at Football and Threatening Communications (Scotland) Act 2012, criminalised behaviour which is threatening, hateful, or otherwise offensive at a regulated football match including offensive singing or chanting. It also criminalised the communication of threats of serious violence and threats intended to incite religious hatred.

The Catholic community in Scotland was once largely working-class. In recent years, the situation has changed markedly: many Catholics can be found in what were called the professions, and it is now unremarkable for Catholics to be occupying posts in the judiciary or in national politics. In 1999, the Rt Hon John Reid MP became the first Catholic to hold the office of Secretary of State for Scotland. His succession by the Rt Hon Helen Liddell MP in 2001 attracted considerably more media comment that she was the first woman to hold the post than that she was the second Catholic. Also notable was the  appointment of Louise Richardson to the University of St. Andrews as its principal and vice-chancellor. St Andrews is the third oldest university in the Anglosphere. Richardson, a Catholic, was born in Ireland and is a naturalised United States citizen. She is the first woman to hold that office and first Catholic to hold it since the Scottish Reformation.

The Catholic Church recognises the separate identities of Scotland and England and Wales. The church in Scotland is governed by its own hierarchy and bishops' conference, not under the control of English bishops. In more recent years, for example, there have been times when it was especially the Scottish bishops who took the floor in the United Kingdom to argue for Catholic social and moral teaching. The presidents of the bishops' conferences of England and Wales, Scotland, and Ireland meet formally to discuss "mutual concerns", though they are separate national entities. "Closer cooperation between the presidents can only help the Church's work", a spokesman noted.

Organisation 

There are four entities that encompass Scotland, England, and Wales.

 The Bishopric of the Forces serves all members of the British Armed Forces throughout the world, including those stationed on bases in Scotland.
 The Personal Ordinariate of Our Lady of Walsingham is a jurisdiction equivalent to a diocese for former Anglicans received into the full communion of the Catholic Church and their families.  It has faculty to celebrate a distinct variant of the Roman Rite based on the Anglican Book of Common Prayer.
 The Ukrainian Catholic Eparchy of the Holy Family of London serves members of the Ukrainian Catholic Church, a sui juris ritual church of Byzantine Rite that is part of the larger Catholic Church.
 The Syro-Malabar Catholic Eparchy of Great Britain serves members of the Syro-Malabar Church.
There are two Catholic archdioceses and six dioceses in Scotland; total membership is 841,000:

The Bishopric of the Forces and the Personal Ordinariate of Our Lady of Walsingham are directly subject to the Holy See. The Ukrainian Catholic Eparchy of the Holy Family of London and the Syro-Malabar Catholic Eparchy of Great Britain was subject to their own metropolitans, major archbishops, and major archiepiscopal synods.

21st century 

Between 1982 and 2010, the proportion of Scottish Catholics dropped 18%, baptisms dropped 39%, and Catholic church marriages dropped 63%. The number of priests also dropped. Between the 2001 UK Census and the 2011 UK Census, the proportion of Catholics remained steady while that of other Christians denominations, notably the Church of Scotland dropped.

In 2001, Catholics were a minority in each of Scotland's 32 council areas but in a few parts of the country their numbers was close to those of the official Church of Scotland. The most Catholic part of the country is composed of the western Central Belt council areas near Glasgow. In Inverclyde, 38.3% of persons responding to the 2001 UK Census reported themselves to be Catholic compared to 40.9% as adherents of the Church of Scotland. North Lanarkshire also already had a large Catholic minority at 36.8% compared to 40.0% in the Church of Scotland. Following in order were West Dunbartonshire (35.8%), Glasgow City (31.7%), Renfrewshire (24.6%), East Dunbartonshire (23.6%), South Lanarkshire (23.6%) and East Renfrewshire (21.7%).

In 2011, Catholics outnumbered adherents of the Church of Scotland in several council areas, including North Lanarkshire, Inverclyde, West Dunbartonshire, and the most populous one: Glasgow City.

Between the two censuses, numbers in Glasgow with no religion rose significantly while those noting their affiliation to the Church of Scotland dropped significantly so that the latter fell below those that identified with an affiliation to the Catholic Church.

At a smaller geographic scale, one finds that the two most Catholic parts of Scotland are: (1) the southernmost islands of the Western Isles, especially Barra and South Uist, populated by Gaelic-speaking Scots of long-standing; and (2) the eastern suburbs of Glasgow, especially around Coatbridge, populated mostly by the descendants of Irish Catholic immigrants.

According to the 2011 UK Census, Catholics comprise 16% of the overall population, making it the second-largest church after the Church of Scotland (32%).

Along ethnic or racial lines, Scottish Catholicism was in the past, and has remained at present, predominantly White or light-skinned in membership, as have always been other branches of Christianity in Scotland. Among respondents in the 2011 UK Census who identified as Catholic, 81% are White Scots, 17% are Other White (mostly other British or Irish), 1% is either Asian, Asian Scottish or Asian British, and an additional 1% is either mixed-race or from multiple ethnicities; African; Caribbean or black; or from other ethnic groups.

In recent years the Catholic Church in Scotland has experienced bad publicity due to statements made by bishops in defence of traditional Christian morality and in criticism of secular and liberal ideology. Joseph Devine, Bishop of Motherwell, came under fire after alleging that the "gay lobby" were mounting "a giant conspiracy" to completely destroy Christianity. Criticism was also levelled at perceived intransigence on joint faith schools and threats to withdraw acquiescence unless guarantees of separate staff rooms, toilets, gyms, visitor, and pupil entrances were not met.

In 2003, a Catholic church spokesman branded sex education as "pornography" and now disgraced Cardinal Keith O'Brien claimed plans to teach sex education in pre-schools amounted to "state-sponsored sexual abuse of minors."

There has also been even worse publicity related to the sexual abuse of minors. In 2016, a headteacher and teacher of the St Ninian's Orphanage, Falkland, Fife were sentenced for abuse at the orphanage from 1979 to 1983 when it was run by the Congregation of Christian Brothers. Fr John Farrell the last headteacher there was sentenced to five years imprisonment. Paul Kelly, a teacher, was sentenced to ten years. More than 100 charges involving 35 boys were made regarding the orphanage, which had been closed down in 1983. In 2019, it emerged that the Superior General of the Christian Brothers, approved the placement of Farrell at St Ninian's despite previous reports of interfering with boys at a South African boarding school where it was recommended by the African provincial that Farrell should never be placed in a boarding school in the future.

Roughly half of Catholic parishes in the West of Scotland were closed or merged because of a priest shortage and over half have closed in the Archdiocese of St Andrews and Edinburgh.

In early 2013, Scotland's most senior cleric, Cardinal Keith O'Brien, resigned after allegations of sexual misconduct were made against him and partially admitted. Subsequently, allegations were made that several other cases of alleged sexual misconduct took place involving other priests.

See also

 Catholic Church by country
 Catholic Church hierarchy
 Catholic Church in England and Wales
 Catholic Church in Ireland (includes Northern Ireland)
 Catholic Church in the United Kingdom
 List of Catholic churches in Scotland
 List of Catholic schools in Scotland
 List of monastic houses in Scotland
 Lists of patriarchs, archbishops, and bishops
 Catholicism in the Western Isles
 Carfin Grotto
 Scottish Catholic Observer
 The World, the Flesh, and Father Smith, a novel about the life of a Scottish Catholic priest

References

External links
Bishops' Conference of Scotland
Facts about Catholics in Scotland
Catholic Encyclopedia's article on Scotland
Scottish Catholic Observer
National Library of Scotland: SCOTTISH SCREEN ARCHIVE (selection of archive films relating to Catholicism in Scotland)

 
Scotland